The stonemason toadlet (Uperoleia lithomoda) is a species of frog in the family Myobatrachidae.
It is found in Australia, Papua New Guinea, and possibly Indonesia.
Its natural habitats are dry savanna, moist savanna, subtropical or tropical dry lowland grassland, subtropical or tropical seasonally wet or flooded lowland grassland, intermittent rivers, intermittent freshwater lakes, and intermittent freshwater marshes.

References

Uperoleia
Amphibians of Queensland
Amphibians of the Northern Territory
Amphibians of Western Australia
Taxonomy articles created by Polbot
Amphibians described in 1981
Frogs of Australia